Joost Gerardus Bernard Volmer (born 7 March 1974), simply known as Joost Volmer, is a retired Dutch footballer. Volmer played for various club teams in the Netherlands, and played once abroad, for West Bromwich Albion. He retired from professional football in November 2009, then playing for De Graafschap, after stating that he could not give a 100% anymore.

External links
Joost Volmer at Voetbal International

1974 births
Living people
Dutch footballers
FC Twente players
Helmond Sport players
VVV-Venlo players
MVV Maastricht players
Fortuna Sittard players
AZ Alkmaar players
West Bromwich Albion F.C. players
FC Den Bosch players
De Graafschap players
Eredivisie players
Eerste Divisie players
Footballers from Enschede
Association football defenders
HSC '21 players
Expatriate footballers in England
Dutch expatriate footballers
Dutch expatriate sportspeople in England